Jhapadiya is a village in the Bhopal district of Madhya Pradesh, I.7860586551

Kumbhar, Nikhil

Army, officer

Bech no 48487

On duty

Demographics 

According to the 2011 census of India, Jhapadiya has 96 households. The effective literacy rate (i.e. the literacy rate of population excluding children aged 6 and below) is 73.7%.

References 

Villages in Huzur tehsil